Ken Ilsø Larsen (born 2 December 1986) is a Danish former professional footballer who last played for Adelaide United in the A-League. He has previously represented Denmark at U19, U20 and U21 levels. Ilsø is also currently pursuing a Bachelor's degree in law at the University of Southern Denmark.

Youth career 
Born in Copenhagen, Ilsø started his footballing career at local amateur club BK Pioneren. He subsequently was joined by his brother Marco Ilsø, playing for several youth teams in Copenhagen. In 2004, he was signed as a youth player by Dutch side SC Heerenveen, after being labelled as one of Denmark's finest talents. On 16 April 2006, he made his senior team debut for SC Heerenveen, also his only senior appearance with the club, in an Eredivisie match against AZ Alkmaar as a 75th-minute substitute for teammate Arnold Bruggink.

Club career

SC Heerenveen 
Following his first-team debut with SC Heerenveen, Ilsø never managed to make another senior team appearance for the rest of his time at the club. He had a brief loan spell with FC Zwolle on-loan from SC Heerenveen, but did not make a single appearance for the Dutch club.

SønderjyskE 
Unable to break into the first-team plans of SC Heerenveen, Ilsø returned in 2007 to Denmark, and joined local club SønderjyskE. He had a more successful spell with SønderjyskE, scoring 12 goals in 52 league matches for a side that was threatened by relegation.

FC Midtjylland 
In summer 2009, Ilsø was signed by FC Midtjylland, who ended in the fourth spot of the Superliga the prior season. Ilsø quickly became an important player for FC Midtjylland. For instance, in the 2010–11 season opener against Silkeborg IF, Ilsø scored the decisive goal to earn a win for the club .

Fortuna Düsseldorf 
Following his performance with FC Midtjylland, Ilsø joined 2. Bundesliga club Fortuna Düsseldorf on-loan in the 2010 winter transfer window. Fortuna Düsseldorf subsequently signed him permanently in the following year's summer transfer window, for a reported fee of €300,000.

On 15 December 2012, in a Bundesliga match against Hannover 96, Ilsø played an integral role by scoring the decisive goal for Fortuna Düsseldorf to end the tie in a 2–1 victory. By the end of the Bundesliga 2012–13 season, Fortuna Düsseldorf was in the 17th place, and had to face Hertha BSC in the relegation play-off. Across both legs of the play-off, Ilsø assisted twice, once in each leg, but could not prevent Fortuna Düsseldorf from being relegated back to 2. Bundesliga after a single season in the top flight as the aggregate score of the play-off ended in a 3–4 loss.

VfL Bochum 
In the summer 2013 transfer window, a transfer deal was agreed, with Ilsø joining VfL Bochum from Fortuna Düsseldorf. Apart from playing for VfL Bochum's first team, Ilsø also made a single appearance for the club's reserve team, VfL Bochum II, in a Regionalliga West match against Sportfreunde Siegen.

Guangzhou R&F 
In February 2014, Ilsø joined Chinese Super League side Guangzhou R&F, but he left the club after only three months due to a reduction in his playing time.

Home United 
In January 2015, Ilsø signed a contract with Home United to play for the remainder of the season. Before he signed the contract, he attracted the interest of several clubs from his home country, as well as from Thailand, but Ilsø wanted to embark on an adventure far away from home. Ilsø ultimately decided to sign for Home United as he was impressed by the club's youth development philosophy.

Ilsø scored his first competitive goal for Home United just 23 minutes into his S.League debut. Ilsø scored his second goal for Home United in his second match, finding the back of the net from the spot. He continued his goalscoring start to the season by scoring his 3rd goal in the 3rd game of the season. He also laid on an assist for teammate Sirina Camara to secure his team's first win of the season over Tampines Rovers. Ilsø notched his 4th of the season in his 4th consecutive league match for Home United, scoring the first goal of a 2–2 draw against Brunei DPMM.

On 23 December 2015, it was confirmed by Home United that Ilsø will be staying with the club to participate in the 2016 S.League season.

Home United coach, Philippe Aw, was chosen to manage the Singapore Selection side for the 2016 Sultan of Selangor Cup. Ilsø was selected in the 18-man squad for the cup tie that took place at the Shah Alam Stadium on 7 May 2016. Ilsø featured for the entirety of the match which eventually ended 1–1 (3–4 on penalties) in a win for the Singapore Selection team.

In a S.League fixture against reigning champions Brunei DPMM, Ilsø scored 2 of Home United's 5 goals in an eventual 5–0 win, bringing his personal tally to a total of 6 goals in his last 5 competitive games. The win also represented Home United's fourth successive win in the S.League, last achieved by the club in the 2013 S.League season. Ilsø went on to extend his goal scoring streak to a record 8 goals in his last 7 league games after netting once each in S.League fixtures against Young Lions on 11 June 2016 and Albirex Niigata (S) on 18 June 2016.

On 22 November 2016, it was announced that Ilsø will not extend his stay at Home United beyond the 2016 S.League season, despite being offered a contract extension.

Kedah FA 
Following speculation after his rejection of a contract renewal with Home United, Ilsø was confirmed to be on trial with the 2016 Malaysia Cup champions, Kedah FA, on 27 December 2016. It was later officially announced on 3 January 2017 that Ilsø had signed a one-year contract with the club to play for the entirety of the 2017 Malaysia Super League season, after impressing head coach Tan Cheng Hoe during the trial. Ilsø joins Kedah FA as the club's third foreign signing, linking up with Liridon Krasniqi of Kosovo, and Sandro da Silva Mendonça of Brazil.

Penang FA 
On 16 January 2018, Ilsø signed a one-year contract with Malaysia Premier League side Penang. He terminated his contract with Penang by mutual consent on 18 May 2018. Ilso claimed that Penang have not paid him for three months from February 2018 and he will take the case to FIFA through the Denmark FA if he is not paid soon.

Adelaide United 
On 6 July 2018, Ilsø signed a one-year deal with Australian A-League club Adelaide United.   Ilsø made his debut in a friendly match against National Premier League side Para Hills Knights where he earned an assist in a 2–0 victory on 10 July 2018. Ilsø was suspended by Football Federation Australia (FFA) under its National Anti-Doping Policy after testing positive for cocaine. On 18 October 2019, FFA suspended Ilsø for 2 years after testing positive for Benzoylecgonine (metabolite of Cocaine). Shortly after this, Ilsø announced his immediate retirement from professional football.

Career statistics

Honours

Club

FC Midtjylland 
 Danish Cup
 Runner-up: 2010

Home United 
 Singapore Cup
 Runner-up: 2015

Kedah FA
Malaysian Charity Cup
 Winner: 2017
 FA Cup
 Winner: 2017

Adelaide United
 FFA Cup: 2018

References

External links 

 
 
 Ken Ilsø profile – Danish National Team 
 FourFourTwo Article

Living people
1986 births
Danish men's footballers
Denmark under-21 international footballers
SC Heerenveen players
SønderjyskE Fodbold players
FC Midtjylland players
Fortuna Düsseldorf players
VfL Bochum players
VfL Bochum II players
Guangzhou City F.C. players
Home United FC players
Kedah Darul Aman F.C. players
Penang F.C. players
Adelaide United FC players
Bundesliga players
2. Bundesliga players
Regionalliga players
Chinese Super League players
Singapore Premier League players
Malaysia Super League players
A-League Men players
Expatriate footballers in Germany
Expatriate footballers in China
Expatriate footballers in Singapore
Expatriate footballers in Malaysia
Association football midfielders
Association football forwards
University of Southern Denmark alumni
People from Solrød Municipality
Danish expatriate sportspeople in Australia
Danish expatriate sportspeople in Germany
Danish expatriate sportspeople in China
Denmark youth international footballers
Danish expatriate men's footballers
Kjøbenhavns Boldklub players
Boldklubben Frem players
PEC Zwolle players
Sportspeople from Region Zealand